Pelham  is a suburban town in Westchester County, approximately 10 miles northeast of Midtown Manhattan. As of the 2020 census, it had a population of 13,078, an increase from the 2010 census.   Historically, Pelham was composed of five villages and became known as "the Pelhams". Pelham currently contains two independently incorporated villages: the Villages of Pelham and Pelham Manor.

Approximately 28 minutes away from Grand Central Terminal by the Metro-North Railroad's New Haven Line, Pelham is home to many New York City commuters and has an active social community for its residents.

Geography
It is directly north of the New York City borough of the Bronx, and borders Eastchester, New Rochelle, and Mount Vernon.

History 

In 1654, Thomas Pell bought the area within the present-day town from the Siwanoy Indians. He named his manor "Pelham" in honor of his tutor, Pelham Burton.

The Town of Pelham was part of Westchester County when it was established by the post-Revolution New York State legislature in 1788. It included all of City Island and present-day Pelham Bay Park east of the Hutchinson River. In 1889, the town was incorporated at its current boundaries. In 1891, the village of Pelham Manor incorporated. In 1896, the village of North Pelham and the village of Pelham incorporated. In 1975, the villages of North Pelham and Pelham merged, forming the present village of Pelham.

The Village of Pelham and the Village of Pelham Manor share several services such as school and recreational activities.  There is a grassroots movement to continue the consolidation of services in order to reduce taxes. Given the differences in debt levels, tax rates, population and tax base such a consolidation has been opposed by many Pelham Manor residents. Such a merger is unlikely under current conditions.

For many years after 1916, Pelham was the headquarters of the Sanborn Map Company, which produced Sanborn maps.

The Pelham Picture House was added to the National Register of Historic Places in 2010.

Demographics

As of the census of 2000, there were 12,107 people, 4,149 households and 3,190 families residing in the town.

The racial makeup of the town was 87.33% White, 4.57% Black or African American, 0.08% Native American, 3.96% Asian, 1.82% from other races and 2.23% from two or more races. Hispanic or Latino people of any race were 6.02% of the population.

There were 4,149 households, out of which 41.3% had children under the age of 18 living with them, 64.4% were married couples living together, 9.7% had a female householder with no husband present and 23.1% were non-families. 19.4% of all households were made up of individuals, and 8.3% had someone living alone who was 65 years of age or older. The average household size was 2.86 and the average family size was 3.31.

In the town, the population was spread out, with 28.6% under the age of 18, 5.1% from 18 to 24, 28.3% from 25 to 44, 25.1% from 45 to 64 and 12.9% who were 65 years of age or older. The median age was 38 years. For every 100 females, there were 93.4 males.

For every 100 females age 18 and over, there were 86.9 males.

The median income for a household in the town was $91,810 and the median income for a family was $112,339. Males had a median income of $74,760 versus $46,086 for females. The per capita income for the town was $51,548. About 2.2% of families and 3.7% of the population were below the poverty line, including 4.3% of those under age 18 and 3.2% of those age 65 or over.

Economy
Major employers in Pelham include Pico Electronics, Barksdale Home Care Services Corp., Pelham Public Schools, the New York Athletic Club, and the De Cicco & Sons grocery. Other companies based in Pelham include Archie Comics.

Climate

Education
Pelham is home to four elementary schools (two located in each village), one middle school, and one high school. The elementary schools are Hutchinson, Colonial, Siwanoy, and Prospect Hill. Pelham Middle School and Pelham Memorial High School gather students for all of Pelham. These are all part of the Pelham Union Free School District. There are also several private and religious based schools. Since 1948, New York City has paid the district to educate children who live in Bronx Manor, as doing so is less expensive than sending school buses there.

Fire department
The Village of Pelham Fire Department has 10 firefighters and five lieutenants, using one fire station. The fleet has two engines, one ladder, one utility unit, and a command vehicle. The Pelham Fire Department responds to approximately 800 emergency calls annually.

Religion

St. Catharine's Catholic Church

St. Catharine's was originally a mission church of St Gabriel's parish in New Rochelle. In July 1896 a frame church was built in the newly incorporated village of Pelham on land donated by Mr. and Mrs. Patrick Farrell. In December 1897 St. Catharine's became a separate parish with Rev. Francis P. McNichol as first pastor. A school was established in 1904, staffed by the Sisters of St. Francis. At the end of the school year in 1983 St. Catharine's School closed bringing to an end 75 years of Catholic education in the parish. The school building was converted to a Parish Center to provide space for Religious Education classes, parish activities and groups to meet. A new church was dedicated in 1909.

In 1936 W. T. Grant, who owned a chain of five-and-ten cent stores, gave property in Pelham Manor to St. Catharine's to serve as a separate “mission”. The mission evolved to become Our Lady of Perpetual Help parish, with its own church building. In 2014 it was announced that the two parishes would merge, with the newer, larger Our Lady of Perpetual Help building designated as the parish church. However, St. Catharine's Church in the Village of Pelham was retained as a worship center.

Transportation
The Bee-Line Bus System provides bus service to Pelham.

On Amtrak, Pelham is located closest to the New Rochelle station ("NRO") on the Northeast Corridor. On Metro-North Railroad, the Pelham station is within Fare Zone 12 on the New Haven Line. Pelham is also about 28 minutes from Grand Central Terminal.

Notable people

Nancy Allen, New York Philharmonic harpist
Liborio Bellomo, boss of the Genovese crime family
Alessandra Biaggi (born 1986), New York State Senator
Nick Bollettieri (1931-2022), tennis coach
Charles Lewis Bowman, architect, designed nine homes
Felix Cavaliere (born 1942), musician- founder of The Young Rascals
Antonio Ciacca, jazz pianist, composer and conductor
Joseph Cross, Hollywood actor, starred in films such as Jack Frost, Milk, and Lincoln
Tony DeMeo, retired college football coach, author, and motivational speaker
Kate Douglass, 2020 Tokyo Olympics swimmer, bronze medal winner
Brett Gardner (born 1983), Major League Baseball player
C. P. H. Gilbert, architect best known for designing townhouses and mansions, retired in Pelham Manor at his home on 216 Townsend Avenue
Herman 'Jackrabbit' Smith-Johannsen (1875-1987), Norwegian credited for introducing cross-country skiing to North America
Mary Lorson, musician
Richard Rood (born 1955), Grammy Award-winning violinist
Clinton Roosevelt (1804–1898), politician and inventor
Ethel Schwabacher (1903—1984), abstract expressionist painter
Michael Schwerner (1939-1964), civil rights worker murdered by the Ku Klux Klan while helping African-Americans register to vote in Mississippi
Gary Scott (born 1968), Major League Baseball player
Gene Stone (born 1951), writer and editor
James M. Stone, Founder, Chairman, and CEO, Plymouth Rock Assurance
Dame Nita Barrow, Ambassador to the United Nations for Barbados

Image gallery

References

External links

Town of Pelham official website
Pelham Union Free School District
Historic Pelham, website by town historian
Historic Pelham, blog by town historian

 
Towns in Westchester County, New York
Towns in the New York metropolitan area
Populated coastal places in New York (state)
1788 establishments in New York (state)